Rui Costa (born 1972) is a retired Portuguese footballer.

Rui Costa may also refer to:
Rui Costa (cyclist) (born 1986), Portuguese cyclist
Rui Costa (footballer, born 1996), Portuguese footballer
Rui Costa (politician) (born 1963), governor of Bahia
Rui Costa, musician in Silence 4